Wojewoda is a Polish silent historical film. It was released in 1912.

References

External links
 

1912 films
Polish historical films
Polish silent films
Polish black-and-white films
1910s historical films